Fanis Tasinos (28 October 1940 – 22 April 2018) was a Greek professional footballer who played as midfielder.

Club career
Tasinos started playing football at the age of 14 in the Achilleas Corinth where Vangelis Boufis, an official of the club and the employer of Tasinos at the time, gave him a sport's card. Despite the desire of the Olympiacos Corinth team to sign him, he was loaned to Panargiakos for a year. The end of his loan and his return to Achilleas coincided with their merge with Olympiacos Corinth where Pagkorinthiakos was created. With Pagkorinthiakos he was part of the team that participated in the first national division championship in 1959.

In the summer of 1963, AEK Athens and Panathinaikos were interested for his acquisition. The "greens" offered Pagkorinthiakos 300,000 drachmas and 4 players as an exchange, while the President of AEK, Nikos Goumas offered 500,000 drachmas. Tasinos eventually signed for the yellow-blacks with the help of the President of Pagkorinthiakos, Marinos Psomas. With AEK he played for 3 seasons and made the highlight of his career playing in both matches against Monaco for the qualifying phase of the European Cup, even scoring and 1 goal in the first leg in Monaco on 18 September 1963 which ended in a 7–2 defeat. During his spell in the club he won two Greek Cups in 1964 and in 1966. He left the club in the summer of 1966.

Personal life
Tasinos died at the age of 77 on 22 April 2018, the day when his former club, AEK Athens, were mathematically crowned Greek Champion.

Honours

Korinthos
Beta Ethniki: 1961–62, 1962–63

AEK Athens 
Greek Cup: 1963–64, 1965–66

References

1940 births
2018 deaths
Greek footballers
Super League Greece players
AEK Athens F.C. players
Korinthos F.C. players
Association football midfielders
Footballers from Corinth